Alloo is a surname. Notable people with the surname include:

Albert Alloo (1893–1955), New Zealand cricketer
Arthur Alloo (1892–1950), New Zealand cricketer
Cecil Alloo (1895–1989), New Zealand cricketer, brother of Albert and Arthur
Yvette Alloo (1930–2020), Belgian Paralympic table tennis player.